The Smithsonian Migratory Bird Center is a research program dedicated to fostering greater understanding, appreciation, and protection of bird migration. It is located at the Smithsonian's National Zoo in Washington, D.C.

History 
This Smithsonian Institution research program was founded with Congressional support in 1991, and was incorporated in 1997 as part of the National Zoological Park. It came under the Smithsonian Conservation Biology Institute, established in 2010.

From an initial focus on the conservation biology of Neotropical songbirds, it now researches the role of disease in population declines in migratory birds, environmental challenges facing urban and suburban birds and their adaptation to changes in natural and anthropogenic habitats and climate, and the conservation biology of wetland birds.  Their research group has long-term research programs dealing with migratory birds in both their breeding and non-breeding areas, with studies of how specific breeding and non-breeding populations are connected by migration.

The center is led by wildlife biologist Scott Sillett.

Programs 
In 1998, it developed the Bird Friendly coffee program that fosters management practices at coffee farms that are good for birds while remaining marketable.  Coffee grown under the program is certified as shade grown and organic, with purchases supporting the conservation of migratory birds. The criteria for Bird Friendly certification was developed from basic research on migratory bird-habitat relationships by Smithsonian Migratory Bird Center scientists.

The center sponsors advanced undergraduate and graduate students at collaborating institutions, as well as in-house post-doctoral fellowships.  The center's education efforts include the creation of International Migratory Bird Day,  a holiday which is celebrated on the second Saturday of May in the United States and Canada, and on the second Saturday of October in most of Latin America.

Neighborhood Nestwatch is the center's community-based science and educational outreach program where volunteers monitor the reproductive success and survival of birds in their communities.

Its Bridging the Americas/Unidos por las Aves program is an education program that partners elementary school classes in the Washington, D.C. area with classes in Latin America and the Caribbean. The goals of the program are: 
 To teach students about the migratory birds that connect these two regions of the hemisphere and the need to protect their habitats
 To stimulate an interest in learning about other countries and their cultures

Since 1993, over 17,000 students in grades third through eighth from 11 countries of the Americas have participated.

References

External links
 Smithsonian Migratory Bird Center

Ornithological organizations in the United States
Smithsonian Institution research programs
National Zoological Park (United States)
Bird migration
Biological research institutes in the United States
Zoological research institutes
Research institutes in Washington, D.C.